Chaetocnephalia is a genus of bristle flies in the family Tachinidae. There are about five described species in Chaetocnephalia.

Species
These five species belong to the genus Chaetocnephalia:
 Chaetocnephalia alpina Townsend, 1915 c g
 Chaetocnephalia americana (Schiner, 1868) c g
 Chaetocnephalia andina Cortes & Campos, 1971 c g
 Chaetocnephalia cortesi Gonzalez, 2004 c g
 Chaetocnephalia innupta Cortes, 1945 c g
Data sources: i = ITIS, c = Catalogue of Life, g = GBIF, b = Bugguide.net

References

Further reading

External links

 
 

Tachinidae